Ferenc Hopp Museum of Asiatic Arts is an art museum in Budapest, Hungary.

External links

 

Museums in Budapest
Art museums and galleries in Hungary
Asian art museums in Hungary